The 1904 All-Ireland Senior Football Championship was the 18th staging of Ireland's premier Gaelic football knock-out competition. Kerry were the winners.

Results

Connacht Senior Football Championship

Leinster Senior Football Championship

An objection was made and a replay ordered.

Munster Senior Football Championship

Despite a Limerick win Waterford still qualified.

Ulster Senior Football Championship

An objection was made and a replay ordered.

An objection was made and a replay ordered.

All-Ireland Senior Football Championship

Championship statistics

Miscellaneous

 Kerry become the first Munster county to be All Ireland champions for the second year in a row.

References